The 1996 winners of the Torneo di Viareggio (in English, the Viareggio Tournament, officially the Viareggio Cup World Football Tournament Coppa Carnevale), the annual youth football tournament held in Viareggio, Tuscany, are listed below.

Format
The 24 teams are seeded in 6 groups. Each team from a group meets the others in a single tie. The winning club and runners-up from each group progress to the second round. In the second round teams are split up in two groups and meet in a single tie (with penalties after regular time). Winners progress to the final knockout stage, along with the best losing club. The final round matches include 30 minutes extra time and penalties to be played if the draw between teams still holds. Semifinal losing teams play 3rd-place final with penalties after regular time. The winning sides play the final with extra time and repeat the match if the draw holds.

Participating teams
Italian teams

  Atalanta
  Bari
  Brescia
  Cagliari
  Cesena
  Cosenza
  Fiorentina
  Inter Milan
  Juventus
  Lazio
  Napoli
  Nola
  Padova
  Palermo
  Parma
  Roma
  Torino

European teams

  Slavia Prague
  Bayern München
  Dinamo Kiev
  Monthey

American teams

  Pumas
  Nacional Montevideo

Oceanian teams
  Marconi Stallions

Group stage

Group 1

Group 2

Group 3

Group 4

Group 5

Group 6

Second round

Knockout stage

Champions

Footnotes

External links
 Official Site (Italian)
 Results on RSSSF.com

1995
1995–96 in Italian football
1995–96 in German football
1995–96 in Czech football
1995–96 in Ukrainian football
1995–96 in Swiss football
1995–96 in Mexican football
1996 in Uruguayan football
1996 in Australian soccer